David Stafford may refer to:

 David Stafford (writer) (born 1949), English writer and broadcaster
 David A. T. Stafford (born 1942), British  historian
 David A. Stafford (1893–1959), United States Marine Corps general
 David Theophilus Stafford (1849–1926), planter, businessman, and sheriff in Central Louisiana